Cocada Amarela is a traditional Angolan dessert made from eggs and coconut. It has a distinctive yellow colour due to the large quantity of eggs used. The name, Cocada Amarela, literally means yellow Cocada. 

Due to Angola's colonial history, Cocada Amarela is highly influenced by Portuguese pastries, which are known for their large quantities of egg yellow in traditional recipes.

Ingredients 

 Grated Coconut
 Salt
 Water
 Sugar
 Egg

See also
 List of African dishes
 List of desserts

References

Angolan cuisine
Desserts